The Embassy of the Republic of Congo in Washington, D.C. is the diplomatic mission of the Republic of Congo  to the United States. It is housed in the historic Toutorsky Mansion, a former residence located at 1720 16th Street NW in the Dupont Circle neighborhood of Washington, D.C.

The ambassador is Serge Mombouli.

See also
 Republic of the Congo–United States relations

References

External links
 
 website

Cambodia
Washington, D.C.
Republic of the Congo–United States relations
Dupont Circle